Lesquite Quoit, (also known as Lanivet or Trebyan Quoit) is a portal dolmen, located near Lanivet in Cornwall, United Kingdom. It is a ceremonial funerary monument built around 3500 - 2600 BC and used by Britain's early farming communities. There are only 20 portal dolmens surviving in the United Kingdom. Many have suffered from stone-robbing and degradation over time. This example is well preserved, and is a scheduled monument. In 1870, J. Polsue recorded that the local tradition was of the stones "having been thrown to their present location from Helman Tor by the Devil playing quoits."

It is situated on the east slope of a ridge, overlooking Red Moor and across to Helman Tor. Historic England describes the structure as: "two upright orthostats and a leaning capstone set into a low stony irregular-shaped mound, possibly the result of field clearance. The capstone measures 5.1m by 3.3m.  It is partially buried and leans against an upright measuring 1.8m high and 1.6m wide. Immediately to the north is a second upright measuring 1.2m high and 2.7m wide." In 1973 several stone socket holes, thought to "represent part of the kerb of the original circular or oval mound", were found 6m south of the orthostats, along with a post-hole thought to be related to an earlier structure beneath the mound. The quoit was first described and illustrated by Blight in 1858 and 1870, it has changed little since. In 1923 it was surveyed and described by Henderson, and subsequently by Pool, the Ordnance Survey and Barnatt. The Ordnance Survey designate the site as a Burial Chamber.

See also

 Lanivet
 Scheduled monuments in Cornwall

References

External links

 

Dolmens
Monuments and memorials in Cornwall